The .356 TSW (356 Team Smith & Wesson) is a centerfire pistol cartridge designed by Smith & Wesson in the early-1990s.

Design
The .356 TSW is similar in size to a 9×19mm Parabellum or a 9×21mm (21.59mm exactly) albeit with a much stronger case allowing for higher pressure and as much as 40% more energy at the muzzle. It was designed to be used in IPSC shooting events, but rule modifications specifically addressing its advantages were hurriedly established to make it irrelevant for competition. Due to renewed interest as a superior cartridge to 357 SIG, new production ammunition and caliber conversion kits for Glock 17 (Gen 1-4) & 19 (Gen 1-5) pistols became available in 2020.

See also
 List of handgun cartridges

References

Pistol and rifle cartridges
Smith & Wesson cartridges